Yesha (lit. Salvation) is an agricultural moshav in southern Israel. Located in the Hevel Shalom area of the Negev desert, it falls under the jurisdiction of Eshkol Regional Council.

History
The moshav was established in 1957 by Jews who were expelled from Egypt in the wake of the 1956 Suez Crisis, though this population eventually left, and was replaced by new settlers. Its name is derived from the biblical passage "with the power of salvation of his [God's] right hand" (Psalms 20:6).

It has been subject to several Qassam rocket attacks launched from the Gaza Strip.

See also
Jewish exodus from Arab lands

References

Egyptian-Jewish culture in Israel
Moshavim
Gaza envelope
Populated places in Southern District (Israel)
Populated places established in 1957
1957 establishments in Israel